Karl Malte von Heinz (1904-1971) was an Austrian architect who designed a number of buildings in India.

Career 
Heinz came to India as a refugee due to the crackdown on the Bahaus movement in Nazi Germany. After coming to India, he assisted Robert Tor Russel in designing the Pataudi Palace in the 1930s.

Hyderabad 
Heinz designed several mansions in Hyderabad, and is regarded as a pioneer of the art deco style in the city.

Delhi 
In the 1940s, he designed several buildings of the Jamia Milia Islamia.

After India's independence, Heinz designed the High Commission of Pakistan, New Delhi, as well as the embassies of Thailand and the Vatican.

Personal life
He married a Russian woman named Bella. The couple did not have any children.

List of works 

 Mount Pleasant building in Hyderabad
 Buildings of the Jamia Milia Islamia
 High Commission of Pakistan, New Delhi

References 

20th-century architects
1904 births
1971 deaths